Parliamentary elections were held in Yugoslavia between 10 March and 10 May 1978 through a complicated delegate system which selected delegates to local, republic, and federal assemblies.

Background
The elections were the second held under the new constitution adopted on 31 January 1974. It provided for a bicameral Assembly with a 220-member Federal Chamber and an 88-member Chamber of Republics and Provinces.

Electoral system
The members of the Federal Chamber represented three groups; self-managing organisations, communities and socio-political organisations. Thirty members were elected from each of the six republics and 20 from the two autonomous provinces, Kosovo and Vojvodina.

In March, voters elected representatives of basic labour organisations. These in turn elected the Communal Assemblies in early April. The Communal Assemblies then elected the members of the Federal Chamber.

The members of the Chamber of Republics were elected by the Assemblies of the six republics and provinces, with each republic electing 12 members and Kosovo and Vojvodina electing eight each. Members were elected in a period ending on 10 May.

Republic and provincial assemblies convened, April
In April and May inaugural sessions of all three chambers of the republics' and provinces' assemblies convened for the first time and elected the presidents of all their bodies.

Republic Presidencies and Executive Councils, April

Assembly convened, 15 May
On 15 May a joint session of both chambers of the Assembly convened for the first time and elected the presidents of all the bodies.

Federal Executive Council elected, 17 May
On 16 May a new Federal Executive Council was elected with Veselin Đuranović serving as its President.

References

Yugoslavia
Elections in Yugoslavia
1978 in Yugoslavia
March 1978 events in Europe
May 1978 events in Europe
One-party elections